Persia is an unincorporated community in Hawkins County, Tennessee, south of Rogersville.

Persia is located on Tennessee State Routes 66 and 70.

History
A post office was established as Persia in 1868, and remained in operation until it was discontinued in 1967. Persia was a station on the East Tennessee, Virginia and Georgia Railway, which was founded in 1869.

Postal service
Persia once had a post office; the closest post office now is in Rogersville. Persia shares Rogersville's ZIP code, 37857.

Education
Cherokee High School is located in Persia.

References

Unincorporated communities in Hawkins County, Tennessee
Unincorporated communities in Tennessee